Schistocarpha is a genus of flowering plants in the tribe Millerieae within the family Asteraceae.

 Species
 Schistocarpha bicolor Less. - Central America, southern Mexico
 Schistocarpha croatii H.Rob. - Panamá
 Schistocarpha eupatorioides (Fenzl) Kuntze - Central America, southern Mexico, western South America
 Schistocarpha hondurensis Standl. & L.O.Williams - Honduras, El Salvador
 Schistocarpha kellermanii Rydb. - Chiapas, Guatemala, Honduras
 Schistocarpha liebmannii Klatt - Oaxaca
 Schistocarpha longiligula Rydb. - Chiapas, Guatemala, Nicarabua
 Schistocarpha margaritensis Cuatrec. - Colombia
 Schistocarpha matudae B.L.Rob. - Chiapas
 Schistocarpha pedicellata Klatt - Oaxaca
 Schistocarpha platyphylla Greenm. - Chiapas, Guatemala, Oaxaca, El Salvador
 Schistocarpha sinforosi Cuatrec. - Colombia, Ecuador, Peru
 Schistocarpha steyermarkiana H.Rob. - Guatemala

References

Millerieae
Asteraceae genera